The Johor State Legislative Assembly is the unicameral legislature of the Malaysian state of Johor. It is composed of 56 members who are elected from single-member constituencies throughout the state. Elections are held no more than five years apart, along with elections to the federal parliament and other state assemblies (except Sarawak).

The State Assembly convenes at Sultan Ismail Building in Kota Iskandar, Iskandar Puteri, Johor Bahru.

Current composition

Seating arrangement

Sultan Ibrahim Building, Johor Bahru (only for opening ceremony of new term assembly)

Sultan Ismail Building, Kota Iskandar (official meeting hall)

Role
The Johor State Legislative Assembly's main function is to enact laws that apply in the state. It is also the forum for members to voice their opinions on the state government's policies and implementation of those policies. Under the Privileges, Immunities and Powers Ordinance 1963, assemblymen are given the right to freely discuss current issues such as public complaints. On financial matters, the Assembly approves supply to the government and ensures that the funds are spent as approved and in the tax-payers' interest.

The State Executive Council (EXCO) is appointed from members of the State Assembly. Led by the Menteri Besar, it exercises executive power on behalf of the Sultan and is responsible to the State Assembly.

Speakers Roll of Honour

Election pendulum 
The 2022 Johor state election witnessed 40 governmental seats and 16 non-governmental seats filled the Johor Legislative Assembly. The government side has 9 safe seats and 4 fairly safe seats, while the non-government side has 1 safe seat and 2 fairly safe seats.

List of Assemblies

See also
 List of State Seats Representatives in Malaysia
 State legislative assemblies of Malaysia

References

External links

 Johor State Government official website

 
State legislatures of Malaysia
Unicameral legislatures
Politics of Johor